Agelescape is a genus of funnel weavers first described by G. Levy in 1996.

Species
 it contains seven species:
Agelescape affinis (Kulczyński, 1911) — Turkey, Syria
Agelescape caucasica Guseinov, Marusik & Koponen, 2005 — Greece, Azerbaijan
Agelescape dunini Guseinov, Marusik & Koponen, 2005 — Azerbaijan
Agelescape gideoni Levy, 1996 — Turkey to Israel, Iran
Agelescape levyi Guseinov, Marusik & Koponen, 2005 — Azerbaijan
Agelescape livida (Simon, 1875) — Mediterranean
Agelescape talyshica Guseinov, Marusik & Koponen, 2005 — Azerbaijan

References

Agelenidae
Araneomorphae genera
Spiders of Asia